The Walnut Hill Plantation cotton gin house was built in the mid to late 1840s by Alonzo T. Mial, a prominent planter and commission merchant in 19th century North Carolina.  It is one of a few surviving cotton gin houses in the state, and is likely the only one to have retained the majority of its original ginning equipment.

The rear third of the gin house rests on short, granite rubble piers, and housed the ground-floor pressing and packaging rooms. Most of the ginning equipment resided on the second floor of the gin house. The third floor was used for storage of baled cotton.

The gin was originally powered by two to four mules hitched to horizontal sweeps that turned the vertical power shaft.  The power shaft was connected to a series of cog wheels that ultimately transferred power to the leather belt that drove the gin.  In 1875, Mial replaced the mules with a 15-horsepower steam engine, which considerably increased the gin's production capacity.  The gin house received a number of other upgrades as ginning technology progressed over the following fifty years.  The Walnut Hill cotton gin ceased operation in the mid-1930s, shortly after the death of Millard Mial, Alonzo T. Mial's oldest son.

Renovation 

Architect Jim Smith, of HagerSmith Design, PA in Raleigh, and his wife purchased the gin house in 1992 and spent the following decade stabilizing the structure to halt its deterioration.  Between 2003 and 2005, they renovated the gin house and converted it to a private residence, where they have lived since.  Their work won them an AIA North Carolina Design Merit award in 2011.

See also
 Walnut Hill Historic District
 List of Registered Historic Places in North Carolina

References

Industrial buildings and structures on the National Register of Historic Places in North Carolina
Industrial buildings completed in 1848
Cotton mills in the United States
Buildings and structures in Wake County, North Carolina
National Register of Historic Places in Wake County, North Carolina